Associated British Hat Manufacturers Ltd was a holding company formed in 1966, by merging five of  Britain's largest felt hat manufacturers. The intention was to rationalize a struggling industry that faced a declining market and foreign competition.

After the merger production was concentrated at the Christy factory in Stockport and the Wilson's factory in Denton. In 1980, ABHM sold the entire share capital of its subsidiary Christy & Co to Cadogan Oakley for £1.2 million. This resulted in the closure of the Wilson's factory, and all remaining hat production being consolidated into the Christy factory, which later closed in 1997.

Companies that merged to form ABHM
 Christy & Co Ltd, Stockport
 Battersby & Co Ltd, Stockport
 T. & W. Lees Ltd, Stockport
 J. Moores & Sons Ltd, Denton
 Joseph Wilson & Sons Ltd, Denton

References

Defunct manufacturing companies of the United Kingdom
Companies based in Stockport
Hat companies
1966 establishments in England
British companies established in 1966
Clothing companies established in 1966
Manufacturing companies disestablished in 1997
1997 disestablishments in England